Mateo Martín Escobar (born 7 November 1995) is an Argentine professional footballer who plays as a forward for Asociacion Deportiva Guanacasteca.

Career
Escobar started his career in the ranks of Defensores Unidos. After appearing for his senior debut in 2016 in Primera C Metropolitana, the forward went on to score fourteen goals in fifty-seven appearances in all competitions across two seasons as they gained promotion to Primera B Metropolitana in 2017–18. He made his bow in the second tier on 16 September 2018 during a defeat to Fénix. His first goals at that level came in March 2019 against Almirante Brown and Colegiales. He scored three more goals across the next twelve months, prior to departing to join the aforementioned Almirante Brown in September 2020.

Personal life
At a young age, Escobar regularly took part in athletics; including the 100m, winning races at the Buenos Aires Games and training at CeNARD. He decided to focus on football after leaving school.

Career statistics
.

Honours
Almirante Brown 

Defensores Unidos
Primera B Metropolitana: 2020
Primera C Metropolitana: 2017–18

References

External links

1995 births
Living people
People from Zárate, Buenos Aires
Argentine footballers
Association football forwards
Primera C Metropolitana players
Primera B Metropolitana players
Defensores Unidos footballers
Club Almirante Brown footballers
Sportspeople from Buenos Aires Province